Robert David Moore (May 3, 1954 – January 7, 2022) was a Canadian professional ice hockey goaltender who played for the Philadelphia Flyers and Washington Capitals. He played his college hockey at the University of Michigan and the University of Western Ontario. Author John U. Bacon claims that Moore was one of the first goalies in either college or professional hockey to not only come out of his net and handle the puck like a defenseman, but "actually shoot it as well as the forwards."  As a minor league goaltender, Moore won the Harry "Hap" Holmes Memorial Award in 1978–79, 1979–80 and 1980–81, sharing the award with a different teammate each time.

Biography
Moore played for the University of Michigan from 1972 to 1976.  He was an NCAA West first-team All-American in 1974, and a second-team WCHA All Star in 1976.  As of 2001, Moore held the Michigan Wolverines hockey record for most saves by a goaltender with 4,434.  He played for the University of Western Ontario for the 1976-77 season.  Moore was drafted by the New England Whalers of the World Hockey Association in the 11th round of the 1974 WHA Amateur Draft but he did not sign with the Whalers.  Although undrafted by the National Hockey League (NHL), he signed as a free agent with the NHL Philadelphia Flyers on November 7, 1978.

Moore spent most of his first three professional hockey seasons with the Flyers' American Hockey League (AHL) affiliate, the Maine Mariners.  In 1978–79, Moore shared the Mariners' goalie job with Pete Peeters and Rick St. Croix, posting a 3.38 goals against average in 26 games as the Mariners won the Calder Cup as the AHL champions.  The Mariners led the AHL in goals against average for the season, and Moore and Peeters shared the Harry "Hap" Holmes Memorial Award, awarded to the goalies who play at least 25 games for the team that leads the AHL with the lowest goals against average.  Moore also played five regular season games for the Flyers that season after Hall of Fame goalie Bernie Parent suffered a career-ending eye injury.  His NHL debut came on March 6, 1979 against the Colorado Rockies, and Moore registered a 5–0 shutout in his debut.  In his five NHL regular season games, Moore had a 1.77 goals against average and also earned one assist.  He ended up with two shutouts in his five NHL games, placing him in the top 10 for NHL shutouts that season, in a tie for 9th overall.

Moore was also on the Flyers' roster for the 1979 playoffs.  He played five games in the playoffs as well, more than any other Flyers' goalie that season.  He had a 4.03 goals against average in the playoffs and one assist, as the Flyers won their first round playoff series against the Vancouver Canucks but lost to the New York Rangers in the second round.

Moore spent the entire 1979-80 season with the Maine Mariners, sharing the goaltending duties primarily with St. Croix.  Moore played 32 games with a 3.51 goals against average. The Mariners again led the AHL in goals against average and Moore again earned the Harry "Hap" Holmes Memorial Award, sharing it with St. Croix this time. In 1980-81 Moore again played the entire season with the Mariners, playing 25 games with a 3.86 goals against average while sharing the goaltending job with Pelle Lindbergh and Sam St. Laurent.  The Mariners led the AHL in goals against average once again, and Moore earned his third consecutive Harry "Hap" Holmes Memorial Award, this time sharing the award with Lindbergh.

After the 1980–81 season, Moore was signed as a free agent by the Minnesota North Stars.  Moore played the entire 1981–82 season for the Nashville South Stars of the Central Hockey League.  After the 1981–1982 season, Moore was traded with a draft choice to the Washington Capitals in exchange for Wes Jarvis and Rollie Boutin.  Moore spent most of the 1982–83 season with Washington's AHL affiliate Hershey Bears, but did play in one game for the Capitals that season.  Moore spent the 1983–84 season, his last as a professional, with the Milwaukee Admirals of the International Hockey League.

Moore died in Sarnia on January 7, 2022, at the age of 67.

Awards and honors

References

External links
 

1954 births
2022 deaths
AHCA Division I men's ice hockey All-Americans
Canadian ice hockey goaltenders
Hershey Bears players
Ice hockey people from Ontario
Maine Mariners players
Michigan Wolverines men's ice hockey players
Milwaukee Admirals (IHL) players
Nashville South Stars players
New England Whalers draft picks
Sportspeople from Sarnia
Philadelphia Flyers players
Undrafted National Hockey League players
Washington Capitals players